The Romania men's national tennis team represents Romania in Davis Cup tennis competition, being governed by the Romanian Tennis Federation and currently competes in the 2019 Davis Cup Europe/Africa Zone Group II.

Romania has finished as runners-up three times. Alongside India, Romania has never won the Davis Cup despite playing three finals.

Current squad
Rankings as of 31 January 2022

Recent callups

History

Romania finished runner-up three times – in 1969, 1971 and 1972 – and lost to USA in the Final on each occasion. The most contested match was in 1972, when Romania lost 3–2, Tiriac and Nastase winning for Romania. Only Romania, Argentina and India have contested more than one Final without being crowned champion. Its first appearance in the competition was back in 1922.

Recent performances

2010s

All players

References

External links

Davis Cup teams
National sports teams of Romania
Tennis in Romania